Paul Gilroy  (born 16 February 1956) is an English sociologist and cultural studies scholar who is the founding Director of the Sarah Parker Remond Centre for the Study of Race and Racism at University College, London (UCL). Gilroy is the 2019 winner of the €660,000 Holberg Prize, for "his outstanding contributions to a number of academic fields, including cultural studies, critical race studies, sociology, history, anthropology and African-American studies".

Biography

Early life
Gilroy was born on 16 February 1956 in the East End of London to a Guyanese mother, novelist Beryl Gilroy, and an English father, Patrick, who was a scientist. He has a sister, Darla. He was educated at University College School and obtained his bachelor's degree at the University of Sussex in 1978. He moved to Birmingham University, where he completed his PhD in 1986.

Career
Gilroy is a scholar of cultural studies and black Atlantic diasporic culture with interests in the "myriad manifestations of black British culture". He is the author of There Ain't No Black in the Union Jack (1987), Small Acts (1993), The Black Atlantic (1993), Between Camps (2000; also published as Against Race in the United States), and After Empire (2004; published as Postcolonial Melancholia in the United States), among other works. Gilroy was also co-author of The Empire Strikes Back: Race and Racism in 1970s Britain (1982), a path-breaking, collectively produced volume published under the imprint of the Centre for Contemporary Cultural Studies at Birmingham University, where he was a doctoral student working with the Jamaican intellectual Stuart Hall. Other members of the group include Valerie Amos, Hazel Carby and Pratibha Parmar.

Gilroy taught at South Bank Polytechnic, Essex University, and then for many years at Goldsmiths, University of London, before taking up a tenured post in the US at Yale University, where he was the chair of the Department of African American Studies and Charlotte Marian Saden Professor of Sociology and African American Studies. He was the first holder of the Anthony Giddens Professorship in Social Theory at the London School of Economics before he joined King's College London in September 2012.

Gilroy worked for the Greater London Council for several years in the 1980s before becoming an academic. During that period, he was associated with the weekly listings magazine City Limits (where he was a contributing editor between 1982 and 1984) and The Wire (where he had a regular column from 1988 to 1991). Other publications for which he wrote during this period include New Musical Express, The New Internationalist and New Statesman and Society.

Gilroy is known as a path-breaking scholar and historian of the music of the black Atlantic diaspora, as a commentator on the politics of race, nation and racism in the UK, and as an archaeologist of the literary and cultural lives of blacks in the western hemisphere. According to the US Journal of Blacks in Higher Education he has been consistently among the most frequently cited black scholars in the humanities and social sciences. He held the top position in the humanities rankings in 2002, 2004, 2006, 2007 and 2008.

Gilroy holds honorary doctorates from the Goldsmiths University of London, the University of Liège 2016, the University of Sussex, and the University of Copenhagen.

In Autumn 2009 he served as Treaty of Utrecht Visiting Professor at the Centre for Humanities, Utrecht University. Gilroy was awarded a 50th Anniversary Fellowship of Sussex University in 2012.

In 2014 he was elected a fellow of the British Academy, the United Kingdom's national academy for the humanities and social sciences. In the same year, he was elected Fellow of the Royal Society of Literature. He was elected an international honorary member of the American Academy of Arts & Sciences in April 2018.

In 2020, Gilroy became the founding director of University College London's Sarah Parker Remond Centre (formerly the Centre for the Study of Racism & Racialisation), named in honour of the transatlantic abolitionist and women's rights activist.

Personal life
Gilroy is married to writer, photographer and academic Vron Ware. The couple live in north London, and have two children, Marcus and Cora.

The Black Atlantic

Summary 
Gilroy's 1993 book The Black Atlantic: Modernity and Double Consciousness marks a turning point in the study of diasporas. Applying a cultural studies approach, he provides a study of African intellectual history and its cultural construction. Moving away from all cultural forms that could be deemed ethnic absolutism, Gilroy offers the concept of the black Atlantic as a space of transnational cultural construction. In his book, Gilroy makes the peoples who suffered from the Atlantic slave trade the emblem of his new concept of diasporic peoples. This new concept breaks with the traditional diasporic model based on the idea that diasporic people are separated by a communal source or origin, offering a second model that privileges hybridity. Gilroy's theme of double consciousness involves black Atlantic striving to be both European and black through their relationship to the land of their birth and their ethnic political constituency being absolutely transformed.

Rather than encapsulating the African-American tradition within national borders, Gilroy recognizes the actual significance of European and African travels of many African-American writers. To prove his point, he re-reads the works of African-American intellectuals against the background of a trans-Atlantic context. Gilroy's concept of the black Atlantic fundamentally disrupts contemporary forms of cultural nationalism and reopens the field of African-American studies by enlarging the field's interpretive framework.

Gilroy offers a corrective to traditional notions of culture as rooted in a particular nation or history, suggesting instead an analytic that foregrounds movement and exchange. In an effort to disabuse scholars of cultural studies and cultural historians in the UK and the US from assuming a "pure" racial, ethnic, and class-based politics/political history, Gilroy traces two legacies of political and cultural thought that emerge through cross-pollination. Gilroy critiques New Leftists for assuming a purely nationalist identity that in fact was influenced by various black histories and modes of exchange. Gilroy's initial claim seeks to trouble the assumptive logics of a "pure" western history (canon), offering instead a way to think these histories as mutually constituted and always already entangled.

Gilroy uses the transatlantic slave trade to highlight the influence of "routes" on black identity. He uses the image of a ship to represent how authentic black culture is composed of cultural exchanges since the slave trade stifled blacks' ability to connect to a homeland. He claims that there was a cultural exchange as well as a commodity exchange that defines the transatlantic slave trade and thus black culture. In addition, he discusses how black people and black cultures were written out of European countries and cultures via the effort to equate white people with institutions and cultures, which causes whiteness to be conflated with Europe as a country and black people being ignored and excluded. This causes blackness and "Europeanness" to be viewed as separate entities lacking symbiosis. Whiteness and Europeanness even went so far as to create a culture such that blackness becomes a threat to the sanctity of these European cultures.

An example of how Gilroy and his concepts in The Black Atlantic directly affected a specific field of African-American studies is its role in defining and influencing the shift between the political black British movement of the 1960 and '70s to the 1980 and '90s. Gilroy came to reject outright the working-class movements of the 1970s and '80s on the basis that the system and logic behind the movements were fundamentally flawed as a result of their roots in the way of thinking that not only ignored race but also the trans-Atlantic experience as an integral part of the black experience and history. This argument is expanded upon in one of his previous co-authored books, The Empire Strikes Back (1983), which was supported by the (now closed) Centre for Contemporary Cultural Studies of the University of Birmingham in the UK.

The Black Atlantic received an American Book Award in 1994. The book has subsequently been translated into Italian, French, Japanese, Portuguese and Spanish. The influence of the study is generally accepted to be profound, though academics continue to debate in exactly what form its greatest significance may lie.

The theoretical use of the ocean as a liminal space alternative to the authority of nation-states has been highly generative in diasporic studies, in spite of Gilroy's own desire to avoid such conflations. The image of water and migration has been taken up as well by later scholars of the black diaspora, including Omise’eke Natasha Tinsley, Isabel Hofmeyr, and Stephanie E. Smallwood, who expand Gilroy's theorizations by engaging questions of queerness, transnationality, and the middle passage.

Academic responses and criticisms 
Among the academic responses to Gilroy's black Atlantic thesis are: Africadian Atlantic: Essays on George Elliott Clarke (2012), edited by Joseph Pivato, and George Elliott Clarke's "Must All Blackness Be American? Locating Canada in Borden's 'Tightrope Time,' or Nationalizing Gilroy's The Black Atlantic" (1996, Canadian Ethnic Studies 28.3).

Additionally, scholar Tsiti Ella Jaji discusses Gilroy and his conceptualization of the black Atlantic as the "inspiration and provocation" for her 2014 book Africa in Stereo: Modernism, Music, and Pan-African Solidarity. While finding Gilroy's discussion of music in the black diaspora compelling and inspiring, Jaji has two main points of contention that provoked her to critique and to dissect his theories. Her first critique of Gilroy's theories are that they neglect continental Africa in this space of music production, creating an understanding of black diaspora that is exclusive of Africa.

Jaji's second point is that Gilroy does not examine the role that gender plays in black music production. Jaji discusses how Gilroy's The Black Atlantic, while enriching the collective understanding of trans-Atlantic black cultural exchange, devalues the incorporation of gender into his analysis; she uses as an example chapter one of The Black Atlantic, in which Gilroy says: "Black survival depends upon forging a new means to build alliances above and beyond petty issues like language, religion, skin colour, and to a lesser extent gender." Further, Gilroy does not include female voices in his discussion of music and trans-Atlantic black cultural exchange, which Jaji argues contributes to a gendered understanding of pan-Africanism that is largely male-dominated.

An additional academic response to Gilroy's work is by scholar Julian Henriques. Gilroy concludes the first chapter of his book The Black Atlantic Modernity and Double Consciousness with the quote: "social self-creation through labour is not the centre-piece of emancipatory hopes....Artistic expression...therefore becomes the means towards both individual self-fashioning and communal liberation" (Gilroy, 40). This quote about the liberatory potential of art as a transatlantic cultural product exemplifies Gilroy's argument that for black people, forms of culture take on a heightened meaning in light of black persons being excluded from representation in the traditional political apparatus. As such, Gilroy argues that culture is the mode through which black persons should aspire to liberation.

In working to understand black culture, Gilroy asks readers to focus on routes of movement of black persons and black cultural production, as opposed to focusing on roots of origin. However, Henriques argues that Gilroy's focus on routes in themselves is limiting to one's understanding of the black diaspora. Henriques introduces the idea of "propagation of vibration", described as the diffusion of a spectrum of frequencies through a variety of media, in his essay, "Sonic Diaspora, Vibrations, and Rhythm: Thinking Through the Sounding of the Jamaican Dancehall Session" (Henriques, 221).

This theory of the propagation of vibrations provides language to understand the diffusion of vibrations beyond the material (accessible) sonic and musical fields or the physical circulation of objects that can be tracked through Gilroy's routes. Henriques described vibrations as having corporeal (kinetic) and ethereal (meaning based) qualities that can be diffused similarly to the accessible fields, and argues that Gilroy's routes language does not encapsulate these frequencies of vibrations (224–226).

Selected awards
 2005: Honorary doctorate from Goldsmiths College, University of London
 2012: 50th Anniversary Fellowship of University of Sussex
 2014: Elected a Fellow of the British Academy
 2016: Honorary doctorate from the University of Liège
 2017: Honorary doctorate from University of Sussex
 2018: Elected an international honorary member of the American Academy of Arts & Sciences
 2019: The Holberg Prize (€600,000)

Bibliography
 1982: (co-author) The Empire Strikes Back: Race and Racism in '70s Britain, London: Hutchinson/Centre for Contemporary Cultural Studies
 1987: There Ain't No Black in the Union Jack: The Cultural Politics of Race and Nation, London: Hutchinson
 1993: The Black Atlantic: Modernity and Double Consciousness, London: Verso Books
 1993: Small Acts: Thoughts on the Politics of Black Cultures, London: Serpent's Tail
 1995: (with Iain Chambers) Hendrix, hip-hop e l’interruzione del pensiero, Costa & Nolan.
 2000: Against Race: Imagining Political Culture Beyond the Color Line, The Belknap Press of Harvard University Press
 2000: Between Camps: Nations, Culture and the Allure of Race, London: Allen Lane
 2000: Without Guarantees: Essays in Honour of Stuart Hall (co-edited with Angela McRobbie and Lawrence Grossberg), London: Verso
 2004: After Empire: Melancholia or Convivial Culture, London: Routledge
 2007: Black Britain - A Photographic History (with an introduction by Stuart Hall), London: Saqi
 2009: (co-author) Kuroi Taiseiyo to Chishikijin no Genzai (The Black Atlantic and Intellectuals Today), Shoraisha
 2010: Darker Than Blue: On The Moral Economies of Black Atlantic Culture, Harvard University Press

References

Further reading
McNeil, Daniel. Sex and Race in the Black Atlantic: Mulatto Devils and Multiracial Messiahs. New York: Routledge, 2010.
Nishikawa, Kinohi. "Paul Gilroy", in Hans Ostrom and J. David Macey, Jr (eds), The Greenwood Encyclopedia of African American Literature. 5 vols. Westport, CT: Greenwood Press, 2005. 630–32.

External links
 Paul Gilroy - Bibliography. Compiled by Eddie Yeghiayan
 Paul Gilroy on Twitter
 Lecture on "Paul Gilroy speaks on the riots, August 2011, Tottenham, North London". The dream of safety, 16 August 2011
 Paul Gilroy on openDemocracy
 "Cosmopolitanism, Blackness, and Utopia – a conversation with Paul Gilroy". Interview by Prof. Tommie Shelby in Transition Magazine (2007)
 Interview: Paul Gilroy in Conversation (2007); Video: "Contemporary Racisms: David Theo Goldberg and Paul Gilroy" (2007), darkmatter Journal
 The Black Atlantic website
 The Journal of Blacks in Higher Education citation rankings.
 "Capturing Black Britain in Photos", NPR, February 26, 2008. Gilroy discusses his photographic history of Black Britain.
 
 "Professor Paul Gilroy", interview by Philip Dodd the BBC Radio 3 programme Free Thinking

1956 births
Academics of Goldsmiths, University of London
Academics of King's College London
Academics of the London School of Economics
Alumni of the University of Birmingham
Alumni of the University of Sussex
American Book Award winners
Black British academics
Black British writers
British anti-capitalists
English people of Guyanese descent
English sociologists
Fellows of the British Academy
Fellows of the Royal Society of Literature
Living people
Music historians
People educated at University College School
Yale University faculty
Academics of University College London
Holberg Prize laureates
Writers from London